Cumaribo Airport  is an airport serving the town of Cumaribo in the Vichada Department of Colombia.

See also

Transport in Colombia
List of airports in Colombia

References

External links
OpenStreetMap - Cumaribo
FallingRain - Cumaribo Airport
HERE/Nokia - Cumaribo

Airports in Colombia